Lexington Municipal Airport  is a privately owned public-use airport located three nautical miles (6 km) northwest of the central business district of Lexington, in Ray County, Missouri, United States.

The airport is located just south of Henrietta, Missouri and was previously home to a skydiving facility for over 40 years before new o

Facilities and aircraft 
It has three runways: 04-22 is a 2,925 by 40 ft (892 x 12 m) asphalt strip with runway 04 at 47° and 22 at 247°; 13-31 is a grass field measuring 3,100 by 125 ft (945 x 38 m); 18-36 is also grass and measures 2,250 by 125 ft (686 x 38 m). 04-22 markings are well faded, while the other two are not marked. 04-22 has lights, LIRL 122.7 CTAF. This airfield does not have fuel for sale, only for DZ operations.

For the 12-month period ending September 5, 2007, the airport had 3,375 aircraft operations, an average of 281 per month: 89% general aviation, 9% military and 2% air taxi. At that time there were 7 aircraft based at this airport, all single-engine.

The Dam Skydivers 
The skydiving training center which was previously open at this airport has been relocated to Stockton, MO and is currently doing business as The Dam Skydivers at the Stockton Municipal Airport adjacent to Stockton Lake, with one Cessna 182 aircraft. The owners operate generally every weekend that weather is cooperative.

References

External links 
 Aerial photo as of March 1996 from USGS The National Map
 

Airports in Missouri
Buildings and structures in Ray County, Missouri